Oscar Danielson may refer to:
 Oscar Danielson (rugby league)
 Oscar Danielson (singer)